The National Museum of Natural Sciences is the national museum of natural history of Spain. It is situated in the center of Madrid, by the Paseo de la Castellana. It is managed by the Spanish National Research Council (CSIC).

History 
The gabinete was refounded as Real Museo de Historia Natural in 1815. It changed names until its current denomination, received in 1913. The museum originally hosted a collection donated by a Spanish merchant, Pedro F. Dávila. In 1867, some facilities were separated to give birth to other museums (Archeology, Botanic Garden, Zoologic Garden). In 1987 the museum was restructured and enlarged with funds from two smaller museums.

Collection 
Some of the more relevant components of the museum collections are:
 A Megatherium brought from Argentina in 1789.
 A Diplodocus donated by Andrew Carnegie to Alfonso XIII of Spain in 1913.

Research 
The research departments of the museum are:
Biodiversity and Evolutionary Biology
Evolutionary Ecology
Paleobiology
Vulcanology
Geology

References
Citations

Bibliography

External links
 
Website
 Museo Nacional de Ciencias Naturales, MNCN - CSIC at Google Cultural Institute

Museums in Madrid
Natural history museums in Spain
Natural History
Geology museums in Spain
Buildings and structures in El Viso neighborhood, Madrid